Military Industrial Company (ООО Военно-промышленная компания (ВПК) or Voyenno-promyshlennaya kompaniya VPK) is a Russian industrial company. It was based in 2006. The headquarters is in Moscow. Military Industrial Company produces and sells wheeled and tracked all-terrain vehicles of various purposes.

History
The company was founded on July 31, 2006 by Russian Machines. It included the following enterprises:
 Arzamas Machine-Building Plant  (Arzamas),
 Zavolzhsky plant of tracked towing vehicles (Zavolzhye),
 Hull Plant (Vyksa).

In December, 2011 Russian Machines sold its share in Military Industrial Company to Arzamas Machine-Building Plant.

Owners
The owner of Military Industrial Company is Arzamas Machine-Building Plant.

Management
The managing company is located in Moscow. Its aims include sales, supplement and general management.

The CEO is Sergey Vasyutin according to the Unified State Register of Legal Entities.

Performance indicators
The company employs 6000 people (2017).

Military Industrial Company supplies various types of multi-purpose wheeled and tracked ATVs for Russian public and private entities.

Production
Military Industrial Company is one of the largest world producers of wheeled armored vehicles. Military Industrial Company produces a wide range of combat armored vehicles, including:

 233115 Tigr—M SpN, special purpose vehicle
 SBM VPK-233136 Tigr, special armored vehicle
 AMN 233114 Tigr—M, multi-purpose vehicle
 BMA Tigr, medical armored vehicle
 SPM-3 VPK-3924 Medved, special police vehicle
 BTR-80, combat wheeled amphibious vehicle
 BTR-80A, armored transporter
 BTR-80K, command armored transporter
 BTR-82А, armored transporter
 59037, all-terrain amphibious vehicle
 BREM—K, armored recovery vehicle

References

External links
 Profile VPK 
 Profile VPK 

Defence companies of Russia
Manufacturing companies based in Moscow